Makarovo is a rural locality (a village) in Novlenskoye Rural Settlement, Vologodsky District, Vologda Oblast, Russia. The population was 2 as of 2002.

Geography 
The distance to Vologda is 68 km, to Novlenskoye is 8 km. Bedrino is the nearest rural locality.

References 

Rural localities in Vologodsky District